Kapao Rural LLG is a local-level government (LLG) of Morobe Province, Papua New Guinea.

Wards
01. Otete
02. Langamar
03. Angapena/Angewanga
04. Hiakwata
05. Komakwata
06. Kamiakaka
07. Okaneiwa
08. Yamaiya
09. Pasea
10. Angeweto
11. Aweaka
12. Mekini
13. Hiyewini
14. Pawamanga
15. Ainandoa
16. Mungo
17. Kalasu

References

Local-level governments of Morobe Province